Obudu Mountain Resort (formerly known as the Obudu Cattle Ranch) is a ranch and resort on the Obudu Plateau in Cross River State, Nigeria.

History
It was developed in 1951 by M. McCaughley, McCaughley who first explored the mountain ranges in 1949. He camped on the mountaintop of the Oshie Ridge on the Sankwala Mountains for a month before returning with Mr. Hugh Jones, a fellow rancher, in 1951. Together with Dr Crawfeild, they developed the Obudu Cattle Ranch.

Since 2005, a cable car climbing  from the base to the top of the plateau gives visitors a scenic view while bypassing the extremely winding road to the top.

Geography
It is about 30 minutes drive from Obudu town and is about a  drive from Calabar, the Cross River State capital.

Transport

Charter air service is available to the Bebi Airport which lies between the village of Obudu and the resort. However, the airstrip is no longer functional and the cable car has been grounded for a while now.

Climate 
The climate of the Obudu Cattle Ranch is semi-temperate mountain climate, which is the general weather condition experienced on the Obudu Plateau due to its  elevation.

Tourism 
The ranch has in recent times seen an influx of both Nigerian and international tourists because of the development of tourist facilities by Cross-River State Government, which has turned the ranch into a well known holiday and tourist resort center in Nigeria. It has a serene climate compared to other regions in Nigeria

Gallery

References

External links 
 Obudu Mountain Resort Photos on Eliterics.com
Obudu sights - YouTube

Cross River State
Ranches
Resorts in Nigeria
Tourist attractions in Cross River State
1951 establishments in Nigeria
Hiking in Nigeria